Hans Petter Aaserud is a Norwegian singer and songwriter, mostly known as guitarist in the band Trang Fødsel, founded in 1992. He has collaborated with a long list of artists, including several contributions to the Norwegian version of Eurovision Song Contest, Melodi Grand Prix. In 2018 he participated on Season 7 of Hver gang vi møtes.

Discography 
Singles
Imagine (2017), med Tshawe Baqwa & Tor Endresen

Trang fødsel 
Albums
 Bare barnet (1995)
 Hybel (1997)
 Feber (1998)
 Damp (1999)
 De aller beste (2005)
 Hammock (2007)
 Ryktet (2011)

Singles
 Kursiv (1997)
 Hippie (1997)
 Livet det er helt ålreit (1997)
 James Bond (1997)
 Midt i trynet (1997)
 Manisk (1998)
 Bing bang (1998)
 Drømmedame (1998)
 Hele veien hjem (1999)
 Ligg unna (1999)
 Det kimer i klokker og klirrer i glass (2003)
 Fredag (2005)
 Ikke meg (2007)
 Utopia (2009)
 Ryktet (2011)
 Because I Can Sing (2011), featuring Chris Barron
 Livet mitt lever meg (2014)
 Jeg er faen meg det beste som har skjedd deg (2018)

The Canoes 
 Booze and Canoes (2012)

Mulle Miktor 
 Mulle Miktor (2002)

My Favorite Enemy 
 My Favorite Enemy (2011)

Features on 
 Logikal: Maniacs, Panics and Crashes (1999)
 Pirum Old Boys: Sha-ka-Sha-ka (1999)
 The Wonderboys: B & B's (2000)
 Paris: I do Believe (2001)
 Paris: You Know Me (2002)
 Nicole Lacy: It Was Me (2002)
 Trucks: It's Just Porn Mum/Trouble (2002)
 Trucks: Without You (2002)
 Jack: Star (2003)
 Trucks: Kicking (2003)
 Gaute Ormåsen: New Kid in Town (2003)
 Trucks: Juice (2003)
 West Audio: Rogasnadder (2003)
 Warner Music/Universal Music: Un Maxx' 2 Bruit (2003)
 Jack: Eating Out (2004)
 Glenn: Thanks for Leaving (2004)
 Re-Pita: Re-Play – Re-Pita Mania 2 (2004)
 Jack: Good Girls/15 Minutes of Fame (2004)
 Heine Totland: Atlantis (2004)
 Jack: You Don't Know Jack (2004)
 Heine Totland: Happy As i Am (2005)
 Robert Post: Got None/Give (2005)
 Heine Totland: Crying Shame (2005)
 Robert Post: Robert Post (2005)
 Heine Totland: Tough Times for Gentlemen (2005)
 Lee Harding: What's Wrong with This Picture? (2006)
 Robert Post: The Way We Are EP (2006)
 Aleksander With: The Other Side (2006)
 Aleksander With: Coming Home (2006)
 Susanne Sundfør: Walls (2006)
 D-Side: Unbroken (2006)
 Den Norske Mannsoktett: Voices of Norway (2006)
 Barneselskapet: Barna synger Pophits (2006)
 Susanne Sundfør: Susanne Sundfør (2007)
 Karin Park: Can't Stop Now (2007)
 Gareth Gates: Pictures of the Other Side (2007)
 Celine: Bæstevænna (2007)
 Surferosa: The Beat on the Street (2008)
 Heine Totland: Oh, June (2008)
 Malin: Pang! (2008)
 Melodi Grand Prix: Melodi Grand Prix 2009 (2009)
 Heine Totland: Out Last Summer (2009)
 The Pink Robots: Pink Robots (2009)
 Karin Park: Ashes to Gold (2009)
 Heine Totland: Sunny Side (2009)
 Heine Totland: The Sunny Side (2009)
 a1: Take You Home (2009)
 Trine Rein ft. Paal Flaata: Not for Long (2010)
 Melodi Grand Prix: Melodi Grand Prix 2010 (2010)
 Aleksander With: Still Awake (2010)
 Barnas supershow: Barnas Supershow – Hytta vår (2010)
 Trine Rein: Seeds of Joy (2010)
 The Pink Robots: The Pink Robots (2010)
 Celine: Jentekveld (2010)
 a1: Waiting for Daylight (2010)
 Didrik Solli-Tangen: Guilty Pleasures (2010)
 Malin: Paradis (2011)
 Christine Guldbrandsen: Colors (2011)
 Trine Rein: Just the Way I Am (2011)
 Alejandro Fuentes: Stop Beggin' Me (2011)
 Moi: Chair-o-Planes Part One (2011)
 Frelsesarmeen: 10 år med Frelsesarmeens jule-CD (2011)
 Melodi Grand Prix: Melodi Grand Prix 2012 (2012)
 Aleksander With: Once (2012)
 Susanne Sundfør: The Silicone Veil (2012)
 Aleksander With: Aleksander With (2012)
 Alejandro Fuentes: All My Life (2012)
 Herborg Kråkevik: Jul i stova (2012)
 Mathea-Mari: One of Them (2016)
 Kreftomsorg Rogaland: Kreftomsorg Rogaland 9 (2016)
 Tshawe Baqwa: Drømmedame (2018)
 Hver gang vi møtes: Hver gang vi møtes – Sesong 7 (2018)

References 

1971 births
Norwegian male guitarists
Norwegian singer-songwriters
Living people
Musicians from Tønsberg